General Wheeler may refer to:

Daniel D. Wheeler (1841–1916), U.S. Army brigadier general
Earle Wheeler (1908–1975), U.S. Army four-star general
Edwin B. Wheeler (1918–1985), U.S. Marine Corps major general
Hugh Wheeler (East India Company officer) (1789–1857), East India Company major general
Joseph Wheeler (1836–1906), Confederate States Army and U.S. Army major general
Norman Wheeler (1915–1990), British Army major general
Peter Wheeler (politician) (1922–2015), Georgia National Guard brigadier general
Raymond Albert Wheeler (1885–1974), U.S. Army lieutenant general
Robert E. Wheeler (fl. 1980s–2020s), U.S. Air Force major general
Roger Wheeler (British Army officer) (born 1941), British Army general